Leemaster is an unincorporated community in Buchanan County, Virginia, in the United States.

History
A post office was established at Leemaster in 1905, and remained in operation until it was discontinued in 1972. Leemaster is a name honoring a local resident.

References

Unincorporated communities in Buchanan County, Virginia
Unincorporated communities in Virginia